Skylab X is the ninth studio album by the Brazilian musician Rogério Skylab, the final installment of his series of ten eponymous, numbered albums. It was self-released in 2011, but originally recorded in 2008. A music video was made for the track "Eu Não Consigo Sair Daqui".

The album can be downloaded for free on Skylab's official website.

Critical reception
Writing for blog Miojo Indie, Fernanda Blammer gave the album a positive review, rating it with a 7 out of 10. She praised Skylab X as being "peculiar and eccentric" and "atmospheric", but criticized it for being "less anarchic and aggressive, and more 'well-behaved' than Skylab's previous releases, particularly if compared to the classics Skylab III and Skylab VI".

Ed Félix of Embrulhador.com featured Skylab X in 97th place in its list of the Top 100 Brazilian Albums of 2011.

Track listing

Personnel
 Rogério Skylab – vocals, production
 Thiago Amorim – electric guitar
 Alexandre Guichard – classical guitar
 Pedro Dantas – bass guitar
 Bruno Coelho – drums
 Luiz Antônio Porto – piano (tracks 10 and 12)
 Vânius Marques – mixing, mastering
 Carlos Mancuso – cover art
 Solange Venturi – photography

References

2011 albums
Rogério Skylab albums
Self-released albums
Sequel albums
Obscenity controversies in music
Albums free for download by copyright owner